The simple greenbul (Chlorocichla simplex) or simple leaflove, is a species of songbird in the bulbul family of passerine birds. It is widespread throughout the African tropical rainforest. Its natural habitats are subtropical or tropical dry forests, subtropical or tropical moist lowland forests, and subtropical or tropical moist shrubland.

Taxonomy and systematics
The simple greenbul was originally described in the genus Trichophorus (a synonym for Criniger) and then classified within Pyrrhurus before being moved to the genus Chlorocichla.

References

External links
 
 Image at Animal Diversity Web

simple greenbul
Birds of the African tropical rainforest
simple greenbul
Taxonomy articles created by Polbot